Nadezhda Marinenko (born 23 February 1951) is a Belarusian athlete. She was born at Karanjouka, Homelskaja Woblasz, and competed in the women's high jump at the 1976 Summer Olympics, representing the Soviet Union.

References

1951 births
Living people
Athletes (track and field) at the 1976 Summer Olympics
Belarusian female high jumpers
Olympic athletes of the Soviet Union
Place of birth missing (living people)
Soviet female high jumpers